Euxylophora is a genus of flowering plants belonging to the family Rutaceae.

Its native range is Northern Brazil.

Species:
 Euxylophora paraensis Huber

References

Zanthoxyloideae genera
Zanthoxyloideae